Klepa may refer to:

Klepa, Poland, a village in Poland
Klepa, Greece, a village in the municipality Platanos, Aetolia-Acarnania, Greece 
Klepa, a fictional character, main personage of children's Klepa magazine, books and cartoons, created by Natalia Dubinina